The Reverend Edward Tucker Leeke (1842–1925) was a British clergyman and scholar.  He was Canon and sub-dean of Lincoln Cathedral.

Early life and education 
The son of Revd. William Leeke, the Waterloo veteran and historian, Edward Tucker Leeke was born in 1842.

He was educated at Trinity College, Cambridge, where he was awarded Second Wrangler in 1863.

Career 
He was made a Fellow of Trinity, and was assistant tutor for some years.  He was appointed curate of St Andrew the Less, Cambridge, becoming vicar there in 1869.  In 1877 he was made canon and chancellor of Lincoln Cathedral, and sub-dean in 1898.  He was chaplain at Lincoln Hospital, and for seventeen years was vicar of St Nicholas with St John-in-Newport, in Lincoln. He wrote Ourselves, our People, our Work: Six addresses given in the Divinity Schools, Cambridge, published in 1891.

Personal life 
In 1880 Leeke married Dora Wordsworth, daughter of Christopher Wordsworth, Bishop of Lincoln and younger sister of Dame Elizabeth Wordsworth (1840–1932), first principal of Lady Margaret Hall, Oxford and founder of St Hugh's College. The couple had five sons and two daughters.

Notes

External links
The National Archives: Edward Tucker Leeke, GB/NNAF/P132936

19th-century English Anglican priests
Fellows of Trinity College, Cambridge
Deans of Lincoln
1842 births
1925 deaths
Second Wranglers
Wordsworth family
Alumni of Trinity College, Cambridge